Ian Cowap (10 June 1950 – 10 February 2016) was an English cricketer. He was a right-handed batsman and right-arm medium-pace bowler who played for Cheshire.

He was born in Nantwich, Cheshire and attended Nantwich and Acton Grammar School; he played for Nantwich Cricket Club and for Betley, and also had a spell as professional at Bradshaw in the Bolton Cricket League.

Cowap, who represented Cheshire 60 times in the Minor Counties Championship between 1974 and 1983, made a single List A appearance for the team, during the 1981 NatWest Trophy, against Hampshire. From the lower-middle order, he scored a duck.

Cowap died of cancer at the age of 65 on 10 February 2016.

References

External links
Ian Cowap at Cricket Archive

1950 births
2016 deaths
English cricketers
Cheshire cricketers
People from Nantwich
Cricketers from Cheshire